Ouvrage La Séréna is a lesser work (petit ouvrage) of the Maginot Line's Alpine extension, the Alpine Line. Two more blocks were planned but not completed before the invasion of France in 1940.

Description 
Block 1 (entry): one machine gun embrasure planned but not installed. A short section of gallery lies behind the block.
Block 2 (infantry block): two machine gun embrasures planned but not installed, no connections to the ouvrages galleries.
Block 3 (infantry block): one twin heavy machine gun embrasure and one heavy machine gun/25mm anti-tank gun embrasure planned but not installed, no connections to the ouvrages galleries.

The ouvrage controlled the Col del la Séréna.

See also 
 List of Alpine Line ouvrages

References

Bibliography 
Allcorn, William. The Maginot Line 1928-45. Oxford: Osprey Publishing, 2003. 
Kaufmann, J.E. and Kaufmann, H.W. Fortress France: The Maginot Line and French Defenses in World War II, Stackpole Books, 2006. 
Kaufmann, J.E., Kaufmann, H.W., Jancovič-Potočnik, A. and Lang, P. The Maginot Line: History and Guide, Pen and Sword, 2011. 
Mary, Jean-Yves; Hohnadel, Alain; Sicard, Jacques. Hommes et Ouvrages de la Ligne Maginot, Tome 1. Paris, Histoire & Collections, 2001.  
Mary, Jean-Yves; Hohnadel, Alain; Sicard, Jacques. Hommes et Ouvrages de la Ligne Maginot, Tome 4 - La fortification alpine. Paris, Histoire & Collections, 2009.  
Mary, Jean-Yves; Hohnadel, Alain; Sicard, Jacques. Hommes et Ouvrages de la Ligne Maginot, Tome 5. Paris, Histoire & Collections, 2009.

External links 
 Séréna (petit ouvrage du col de) at fortiff.be 

LASE
Maginot Line
Alpine Line